Richard Michael Linnehan (born September 19, 1957) is a United States Army veterinarian and a NASA astronaut.

Personal
Linnehan was born September 19, 1957, in Lowell, Massachusetts, and was raised by his paternal grandparents, Henry and Mae Linnehan. He grew up in the state of New Hampshire. He is single and enjoys various sports, outdoor activities and natural history.

Education
 1971–1974: Attended Alvirne High School, Hudson, New Hampshire
 1975: Graduated from Pelham High School, Pelham, New Hampshire
 1980: Graduated from the University of New Hampshire with a Bachelor of Science degree in Animal Sciences and a minor in Microbiology
 1985: Received the degree of Doctor of Veterinary Medicine from The Ohio State University College of Veterinary Medicine
 1988: Completed two-year internship in exotic animal medicine and comparative pathology at the Baltimore Zoo and the Johns Hopkins University
 2009: Received the Master of Public Administration degree from Harvard Kennedy School at Harvard University

Organizations

American Association of Zoo Veterinarians
International Association of Aquatic Animal Medicine
Association of Space Explorers
 Adjunct Professor at the North Carolina State University College of Veterinary Medicine in Raleigh, North Carolina
 Board member, Channel Islands Marine and Wildlife Institute, and the Tulane/Xavier/NASA Astrobiology Center, New Orleans, Louisiana

Awards and honors
 Navy Group Achievement Award (1991)
 Navy Commendation Medal (1992)
 NASA Space Flight Medals (1996, 1998, 2002, 2008)
 The American Veterinary Medical Associations President's Award
 The University of New Hampshire Distinguished Alumni Award (1999)
 NASA Outstanding Leadership Medal (1999)
 The Ohio State University College of Veterinary Medicine Alumni Society President's Award (2002) and Distinguished Alumni Award (2002)
 NASA Exceptional Service Medal (2003)
 NASA Distinguished Service Medal (2009)
 Honorary PhDs, Suffolk University, the University of New Hampshire and Ball State University

Career
After graduating from The Ohio State University College of Veterinary Medicine in June 1985, Linnehan entered private veterinary practice and was later accepted to a two-year joint internship in zoo animal medicine and comparative pathology at the Baltimore Zoo and Johns Hopkins University. After completing his internship, Linnehan was commissioned as a captain in the U.S. Army Veterinary Corps and reported for duty in early 1989 at the Naval Ocean Systems Center, San Diego, California, as chief clinical veterinarian for the U.S. Navy’s Marine Mammal Program. During his assignment at the Naval Ocean Systems Center, Linnehan initiated and supervised research in the areas of cetacean and pinniped anesthesia, orthopedics, drug pharmacokinetics and reproduction in direct support of U.S. Navy mobile marine mammal systems stationed in California, Florida, and Hawaii.

NASA career
Selected by NASA in March 1992, Linnehan reported to the Johnson Space Center in August 1992 where he completed one year of astronaut candidate training, qualifying him for Space Shuttle flight assignments as a mission specialist. Linnehan was initially assigned to flight software verification in the Shuttle Avionics Integration Laboratory (SAIL). He was subsequently assigned to the Astronaut Office Mission Development Branch, working on payload development, and mission development flight support for future Space Shuttle missions. He first flew as a mission specialist in 1996 on STS-78, the Life Sciences and Microgravity Spacelab (LMS) mission. In 1998, he served as the payload commander on the STS-90 Neurolab mission. In 2002, he was a member of the four-man EVA crew on STS-109. A veteran of four space flights, Linnehan has logged over 59 days in space, including six EVAs (spacewalks) totaling 42 hours and 11 minutes.

As of 2020, Linnehan is a management astronaut and no longer eligible for flight assignment. Linnehan splits his time between the Astronaut Office Exploration and Integration branches and the NASA Institutional Review Board (IRB) and JSC Institutional Animal Care and Use Committee (IACUC).

Spaceflight experience
STS-78 LMS (June 20 to July 7, 1996). The Life Sciences and Microgravity Spacelab mission was flown aboard Space Shuttle Columbia. The 17-day flight included studies sponsored by ten nations and five space agencies, and was the first mission to combine both a full microgravity studies agenda and a comprehensive life sciences payload. STS-78 orbited the Earth 271 times, and covered  in 405 hours and 48 minutes.

STS-90 Neurolab (April 17 to May 3, 1998) was Linnehan's second Spacelab mission. During the 16-day flight the seven person crew aboard Space Shuttle Columbia served as both experimental subjects and operators for 26 individual life science experiments focusing on the effects of microgravity on the brain and nervous system. STS-90 orbited the Earth 256 times, and covered  in 381 hours and 50 minutes. Both missions served as a model for future life sciences studies on board the International Space Station.

STS-109 HST Servicing Mission 3B (March 1 to March 12, 2002) was the fourth Hubble Space Telescope (HST) servicing mission and Linnehan's third flight aboard Columbia. The crew of STS-109 successfully upgraded the Hubble Space Telescope's systems over the course of five consecutive EVAs, leaving it with a new power control unit, improved solar arrays, the new Advanced Camera for Surveys (ACS), and an experimental refrigeration unit for cooling the dormant Near Infrared Camera and Multi-Object Spectrometer (NICMOS). With his teammate John Grunsfeld, Linnehan performed three of the five spacewalks totaling 21 hours and 9 minutes. STS-109 orbited the Earth 165 times and covered  in just over 262 hours.

STS-123 (March 11 to March 26, 2008) was Linnehan's fourth spaceflight, and his first aboard the Space Shuttle Endeavour. The mission delivered the Japanese Logistics Module and the Canadian Special Purpose Dexterous Manipulator to the International Space Station. Linnehan performed three of the five scheduled spacewalks on STS-123 with Garrett Reisman, Mike Foreman and Bob Behnken.

References

 
Spacefacts biography of Richard M. Linnehan

1957 births
Living people
American veterinarians
Male veterinarians
United States Army officers
United States Army astronauts
People from Lowell, Massachusetts
People from Hillsborough County, New Hampshire
University of New Hampshire alumni
Ohio State University College of Veterinary Medicine alumni
Harvard Kennedy School alumni
North Carolina State University faculty
Recipients of the NASA Distinguished Service Medal
Recipients of the NASA Exceptional Service Medal
Space Shuttle program astronauts
Spacewalkers
Military personnel from Massachusetts